Never Get Old may refer to:
"Never Get Old", a song by Sinéad O'Connor from her 1987 album The Lion and the Cobra
"Never Get Old", a song by David Bowie from his 2003 album Reality